Gallery of strips in eight different Dandy annuals.

The Dandy Book 1978
Peter's Pocket Grandpa
The Jocks and the Geordies
Desperate Dan
Black Bob
Korky the Cat
Jack Silver
Dirty Dick
Desperate Dawg
Screwy Driver
Bully Beef and Chips
The Smasher
Izzy Skint
Greedy Pigg
Winker Watson
Brassneck
Rah-Rah Randall

The Dandy Book 1992
Keyhole Kate
Korky and the Kits
Cuddles and Dimples
Dandy Doodles
Smasher
Brassneckio
The Geordielocks and the Five Bears
Mutt and Moggy
Postman Patel
Winker Watson
Bully Beef and Chips
Desperate Dan Hikes with the Horrors
Bananaman
Dinah Mo
Iron Fish
The Incredible T-Shirt
Tristan
The Hunt for The Loch Ness Monster

The Dandy Annual 2004
Desperate Dan
Cuddles and Dimples
Ollie Fliptrik
Molly
Fiddle O Diddle
Korky the Cat
Winker Watson
Jak and Spike
Owen Goal
Tin Lizzie
Strange Hill School
Blinky
P5
Brain Duane
Beryl the Peril
Puss n Boots
James At School Fete
Bananaman
Marvo the Wonder Chicken
Never Ready Eddie!
The Comet
Willy Wind-Up!

The Dandy Annual 2008
Jak
Cuddles and Dimples
Dreadlock Holmes
My Own Genie
Ted and the Animals
Blinky
Winker Watson
Desperate Dan
Beryl the Peril
Bananaman
Hyde and Shriek
Ollie Fliptrik
Corporal Clott
Pinky's Crackpot Circus

The Dandy Annual 2009
Desperate Dan
Cuddles & Dimples
Jak & Todd
Korky the Cat
Brassneck
Ollie Fliptrik
Hyde N Shriek
Puss N Boots
Ninja Number 9
Beryl the Peril
Bananaman
Gizmo!
Owen Goal
Winker Watson

The Dandy Annual 2010
Desperate Dan
Bananaman
Jak and Todd
Cuddles and Dimples
Beryl the Peril
Lucy Grimm
Marvo the Wonder Chicken
Puss N Boots
Blinky
Ollie Fliptrik
Korky the Cat
Jumbo of the Jungle
Hyde and Shriek

The Dandy Annual 2011
Desperate Dan
Blinky
Jak and Todd
Bananaman
Ollie Fliptrik
Owen Goal
Agent Dog 2 Zero
Cuddles and Dimples
Korky the Cat
Marvo the Wonder Chicken
Bully Beef & Chips
Puss N Boots
Brassneck

The Dandy Annual 2012
Korky the Cat
Blinky
Ways of the Historical Meerkats
Bananaman
Bully Beef and Chips
Corporal Clott
Desperate Dan in the USA
Fiddle O Diddle
Beryl the Peril
George Vs Dragon
Winker Watson
Puss and Boots
Jak and Todd
Brain Duane
Strange Hill School
Kid Cops
Brassneck
Ollie Fliptrik
Cuddles & Dimples
Agent Dog 2 Zero
The Blue Blobs

The Dandy Annual 2016

Comics

Desperate Dan
Winker Watson
Smasher
Korky the Cat
Brassneck
Bully Beef and Chips
Keyhole Kate
Desperate Dawg
Fiddle O'Diddle
Corporal Clott
Jack Silver
George vs Dragon
The Jocks and the Geordies
Greedy Pigg
Beryl the Peril
Big Head and Thick Head
Cuddles and Dimples

Picture Stories
Black Bob

Text stories
What I Did on My Holidays by Winker Watson

Dandy strips
Dandy